Achachi Qala (Aymara for "gigantic stone", also spelled Achachicala) is a mountain north of the Cordillera Real in the Andes of Bolivia which reaches a height of approximately . It is located in the La Paz Department, Larecaja Province, Quiabaya Municipality. Achachi Qala lies southwest of Saywani, northeast of Quriwani and east of Mitalani.

References 

Mountains of La Paz Department (Bolivia)